Jabrayil Hasanov (born on 24 February 1990 in Suparibağ, Astara, Azerbaijan, Soviet Union) is a male freestyle wrestler from Azerbaijan who has competed in the 66, 74 and 79 kg categories.  He is an Olympic bronze medalist and multiple World Championships medalist.
He is the winner of Yasar Dogu Grand-Prix .

Career 
In 2010 and 2011 he won the European championships and finished third at the world championships. Next year he was fifth at the 2012 Summer Olympics.  At the 2012 Summer Olympics, he beat Leonid Bazan and Ali Shabanov before losing to eventual gold medalist Tatsuhiro Yonemitsu in the semifinal.  He was entered into the repechage and lost his bronze medal match to Liván López.

He graduated from the Azerbaijan State Sport Academy and is coached by Aslan Agaev since 2000.

In June 2015, he competed in the inaugural European Games, for the host country Azerbaijan in wrestling, in the men's freestyle 74 kg division. He earned a bronze medal.

In the -74 kg freestyle competition at the Rio Olympics, he beat Carlos Izquierdo and Iakob Makarashvili before losing to Aniuar Geduyev in the semifinal.  In the repechage, he won his bronze medal match against Bekzod Abdurakhmonov.

Competing in the men's -79 kg freestyle competition, he won the silver medal at the 2018 World Championships.  He beat Ethan Ramos, Ali Shabanau and Ezzatollah Akbari before losing to Kyle Dake in the final.  Dake beat Hasanov 2-0 in the final.

Competing in the men's -79 kg freestyle competition, he won the silver medal at the 2019 World Wrestling Championships.  Kyle Dake beat Hasanov 4-2.

References

External links
 

1990 births
Living people
People from Astara District
Wrestlers at the 2012 Summer Olympics
Wrestlers at the 2016 Summer Olympics
Olympic wrestlers of Azerbaijan
Wrestlers at the 2015 European Games
European Games medalists in wrestling
European Games bronze medalists for Azerbaijan
Olympic medalists in wrestling
Medalists at the 2016 Summer Olympics
Olympic bronze medalists for Azerbaijan
World Wrestling Championships medalists
Azerbaijani male sport wrestlers
Universiade medalists in wrestling
Universiade silver medalists for Azerbaijan
European Wrestling Championships medalists
Medalists at the 2013 Summer Universiade